Matt Harding (born 1975) is a British musician, whose music has been described as "scuzzy electronic folk" with "lo-fi beats". Hailing from Northampton but based in London, Harding has released three albums on Moshi Moshi Records.

Discography

Albums
Tomorrow (Moshi Moshi, 2001)
Commitment (Moshi Moshi, 2003)
Expectation (Moshi Moshi, 2006)
"Year" (Reluctancy, 2009)
"Motifs"(Reluctancey 2014)
 “Rooms” (Reluctancey 2020)
 “ Sharp Keys Pull Minds “ (Reluctancey, 2020)
 " Charles" (Reluctancey 2021)
 "Zilch" (Reluctancey 2021)

Singles & EPs
"231" (Heavenly, 2000)
Thinking in Fours EP (Moshi Moshi, 2004)
"Close" (Moshi Moshi, 2006)

References

External links
matt harding blog
Official site
Matt Harding at Moshi Moshi Records

Living people
1975 births
Moshi Moshi Records artists